François Coulon de Villiers (1712 – 22 May 1794) was a French military officer from an influential military family in the French and Indian War and then an influential officer in the New Spain community of New Orleans.

Overview 
He was born in Verchères, Quebec, the son of Nicolas-Antoine Coulon de Villiers and Angelique Jarret de Verchères. In 1744, he was the first commandant of Fort de Cavagnal on the bluffs above the Missouri River, in what was then known as the Illinois country of upper Louisiana, near modern-day Fort Leavenworth, Kansas. It was the furthest west of the French forts in Louisiana (New France).

A member of a military family, his brother Joseph Coulon de Jumonville was slaughtered while in custody of George Washington in what has been called the Battle of Jumonville Glen in 1754. The incident ignited the French and Indian War/Seven Years' War. Another of his brothers, Louis Coulon de Villiers, defeated Washington in the next battle of the campaign in the Battle of the Great Meadows.  It marked the only time Washington had to sue for peace in battle.

Villiers served in many of battles of the war, including the Battle of Fort Duquesne. He was captured in the Battle of Fort Niagara, and had to be exchanged.

After its ultimate defeat in the war, France ceded Louisiana to Spain in the Treaty of Paris (1763). From that time on, Villiers served in various capacities for New Spain, including commandant at Fort St. Jean-Baptiste at Natchitoches in lower Louisiana, and Alcalde for New Orleans, Louisiana.
He died May 22, 1794 in New Orleans.

References 
 
 Monongahela 1754-55: "Washington's defeat, Braddock's disaster" by Rene Chartrand 
 When Worlds Collide: The Fate of Canadian and French Prisoners Taken at Fort Niagara, 1759

People of New France
French Canadian people of the French and Indian War
People from New Orleans
1712 births
1794 deaths
People from Verchères, Quebec